Steffi Graf was the defending champion and won in the final 6–4, 6–2 against Katerina Maleeva.

Seeds
A champion seed is indicated in bold text while text in italics indicates the round in which that seed was eliminated. The top eight seeds received a bye to the second round.

  Steffi Graf (champion)
  Katerina Maleeva (final)
  Sylvia Hanika (third round)
  Sandra Cecchini (quarterfinals)
  Arantxa Sánchez (third round)
  Raffaella Reggi (quarterfinals)
  Isabel Cueto (quarterfinals)
  Bettina Fulco (semifinals)
  Judith Wiesner (first round)
  Neige Dias (third round)
  Jana Novotná (third round)
  Barbara Paulus (third round)
  Sabrina Goleš (third round)
  Radka Zrubáková (semifinals)
 n/a
 n/a

Draw

Finals

Top half

Section 1

Section 2

Bottom half

Section 3

Section 4

References
 1988 Citizen Cup Draw

1988 WTA Tour